Kansas's 7th Senate district is one of 40 districts in the Kansas Senate. It has been represented by Democrat Ethan Corson since 2021.

Geography
District 7 covers the inner suburbs of Kansas City in Johnson County, including Prairie Village, Mission, Roeland Park, Fairway, Mission Hills, Westwood, and parts of Leawood and Overland Park.

The district is located entirely within Kansas's 3rd congressional district, and overlaps with the 19th, 21st, 24th, and 25th districts of the Kansas House of Representatives. It borders the state of Missouri.

Recent election results from statewide races

Recent election results

2020

2016

2012

References

7
Johnson County, Kansas